Erwin Gabathuler  (16 November 1933 – 29 August 2016) was a particle physicist from Northern Ireland.

Early life
Erwin Gabathuler was born in Maghera, County Londonderry, Northern Ireland on 16 November 1933, a son of the manager of the Swiss embroidery factory.  He attended Rainey Endowed School, Magherafelt, and then Queen's University Belfast.  There he studied physics, and was awarded BSc in 1956, and MSc in 1957 for a thesis on "Electron Collision Cross-sections of Atmospheric Gases". He then moved to the University of Glasgow to work at the 300 MeV synchrotron there, and was awarded a PhD in 1961.

Career
He researched at Cornell University, USA from 1961–1964, then Daresbury Laboratory, Cheshire 1965-1974.  He began work at CERN in 1974, as a scientific attaché from the Rutherford Laboratory, Didcot, eventually becoming a direct employee at CERN in 1978 for a 4-year appointment as Head of the Experimental Physics Division, taking over from Emilio Picasso.  He spent 1983-2002 at the University of Liverpool as professor of Physics and head of the particle physics group, maintaining his connections with CERN.  When he retired, the University of Liverpool organised an "ErwinFest" to celebrate his career.

Awards and decorations
He was elected to the Royal Society on 15 March 1990 and received the Rutherford Medal and Prize in 1992 (with Terry Sloan) from the Institute of Physics.  He was made an Officer of the Order of the British Empire in 2001 for services to physics.

He received two honorary degrees, an honorary doctorate from the Faculty of Mathematics and Science at Uppsala University, Sweden in 1982., and a D.Sc. from Queen's University, Belfast in 1997.

Research and Achievements

According to INSPIRE-HEP, Gabathuler co-authored more than 1200 published papers.

He was one of the founding fathers of the European Muon Collaboration at CERN.

Academic Papers published 1958-1977

Photoproduction of strange particles, Proceedings of International Conference on High Energy Physics at CERN, p. 266-269, 1962.

Photoproduction of K+Σ° in hydrogen, Bull. Am. Phys. Soc., 9, 22, 1964 - complete results given here only.
Photoproduction of K+ meson from hydrogen, Proceedings of International Conference on Electron and Photon Interactions at High Energies, p. 203-206, Hamburg, 1965.

Evidence for the ω-2π Decay by ρ-ω Interference in Vector Meson Photoproduction. Invited Paper at International Conference on Experimental Meson Spectroscopy. - Experimental Meson Spectroscopy, Columbia University Press p. 645-655, 1970.
Interference Effects in High Energy Vector Meson Photoproduction. Review Paper in Vector Meson Production and Omega-Rho Interference . p. 115-138, DNPL/R7, June 1970.

Experimental Programme at the Daresbury Laboratory. Invited Talk Photon and Lepton Physics in Europe — DNPL R.11, 1972.
Experimental Utilisation at the NINA Booster - DNPL R13 Vol. II, 1972.
A High Intensity Muon Beam at the S.P.S., Vol. I. Proceedings of the Tirrenia Study Week, p. 208, CERN/ECFA/72/4, 1972.
Total Cross—Sections — Rapporteur Talk at the Proceedings of the 6th International Symposium on Electron and Photon Interactions at High Energies, Bonn 1973.

References

External links
Scientific publications of Erwin Gabathuler on INSPIRE-HEP

Physicists from Northern Ireland
1933 births
People associated with CERN
People from Maghera
Officers of the Order of the British Empire
Fellows of the Royal Society
Alumni of Queen's University Belfast
Alumni of the University of Glasgow
Cornell University people
2016 deaths
British people of Swiss descent